The 1920 Chicago Tigers season was their sole season in the National Football League. The team finished 2–5–1, tying them for eleventh in the league.

Offseason 

The Chicago Tigers were formed in 1920. After the 1919 season, representatives of four Ohio League, a loose organization of professional football teams, teams—the Canton Bulldogs, the Cleveland Tigers, the Dayton Triangles, and the Akron Pros—called a meeting on August 20, 1920, to discuss the formation of a new league. At the meeting, they tentatively agreed on a salary cap and pledged not to sign college players or players already under contract with other teams. They also agreed on a name for the circuit: the American Professional Football Conference. They then invited other professional teams to a second meeting on September 17.

At that meeting, held at Bulldogs owner Ralph Hay's Hupmobile showroom in Canton, representatives of the Rock Island Independents, the Muncie Flyers, the Decatur Staleys, the Racine Cardinals, the Massillon Tigers, the Chicago Cardinals, and the Hammond Pros agreed to join the league. Representatives of the Buffalo All-Americans and Rochester Jeffersons could not attend the meeting but sent letters to Hay asking to be included in the league. Team representatives changed the league's name slightly to the American Professional Football Association and elected officers, installing Jim Thorpe as president. Under the new league structure, teams created their schedules dynamically as the season progressed, so there were no minimum or maximum number of games needed to be played. Also, representatives of each team voted to determine the winner of the APFA trophy.

Schedule

Game summaries

Week 6: at Rock Island Independents 

October 31, 1920, at Douglas Park, Rock Island, Illinois

In week six, the Tigers played the Rock Island Independents. The Independents out-gained the Tigers in first downs, 14 to 3. The first score of the game was a 6-yard rushing touchdown by Independents' Fred Chicken; however, the extra point was missed, so the score was only 6–0. The Tigers took the lead in the second quarter after Annan had a 2-yard rushing touchdown. Chicken ended up having two rushing touchdowns, and Wyman had another rushing touchdown, as the Independents beat the Tigers 20–7.

Week 8: at Canton Bulldogs 

November 14, 1920, at Lakeside Park, Canton Ohio

The Tigers' next matchup was against the Canton Bulldogs. Hay cancelled his game against the Hammond Pros and decided to challenge the Tigers instead because he believed the Tigers were a better team. The first scoring came in the second quarter, when the Bulldogs' Bob Higgins recovered a fumble and ran it back for a touchdown. In the same quarter, Henry caught an interception and ran it back 50 yards for a touchdown. Calac then ran for a one-yard touchdown in the third quarter to seal the 21–0 win.

Standings

Roster

Notes

References 
 
 
 
 
  
 Ziemba, Joe (1999). When Football Was Football: The Chicago Cardinals and the Birth of the NFL. Triumph Books. .

Chicago Tigers seasons
Chicago Tigers